Events from the year 1843 in China.

Incumbents 
 Daoguang Emperor (23rd year)

Viceroys
 Viceroy of Zhili — Nergingge
 Viceroy of Min-Zhe — 
 Viceroy of Huguang — 
 Viceroy of Shaan-Gan — ?
 Viceroy of Liangguang — 
 Viceroy of Yun-Gui — 
 Viceroy of Sichuan — 
 Viceroy of Liangjiang —

Events 
 October 8 — Treaty of the Bogue signed between China and the United Kingdom, concluded in October 1843 to supplement the previous Treaty of Nanking
 the first Treaty Ports were opened
 Anglican diocese of Shanghai established after Rev. William Jones Boone appointed Bishop in Shanghai
 Publication of the Illustrated Treatise on the Maritime Kingdoms, or Haiguo Tuzhi, a gazetteer compiled by scholar-official Wei Yuan and others, based on initial translations ordered by Special Imperial Commissioner Lin Zexu. The Treatise is regarded as the first significant Chinese work on the West

References

 
China